Starfingers is an album by guitarist Sal Salvador that was recorded in 1978 and released on the Bee Hive label.

Reception

The AllMusic review by Scott Yanow stated: "After years of low-profile teaching and playing, guitarist Sal Salvador started to re-emerge on a more national basis in 1978. ... An excellent modern bop album."

Track listing

Personnel
Sal Salvador – guitar
Eddie Bert – trombone (tracks 1, 3, 4 & 6)
Nick Brignola – baritone saxophone (tracks 1, 3, 4 & 6)
Derek Smith – piano
Sam Jones – bass
Mel Lewis – drums

References

Sal Salvador albums
1978 albums
Bee Hive Records albums